Ghritachi is one of the most important apsara (celestial nymph) in Hindu mythology. She is known for her beauty and seduction of many men, both divine and human, and for becoming the mother of their children.

In Hindu literature
Ghritachi appears in many Hindu religious scriptures, including the epics, the Ramayana and the Mahabharata, as well as the Puranas. She is described to be belonging to the daivika (lit. 'divine') class of apsaras, and presides over Kumbha, a month in Indian lunisolar calendar. The scriptures attest that she enjoys seducing men including Rishis (sages), Gandharvas (celestial musicians), Devas (gods) and kings.

According to the Vamana Purana, Ghritachi once lived with Vishvakarma, the architect of the gods, and had a daughter named Chitrangada. Vishvakarma prohibits his daughter to marry anyone, due to which he is cursed to become a vanara (monkey) till a son is borne to him; Ghritachi liberates him by giving birth to Nala, who later helps the god Rama. The Brahma Vaivarta Purana attributes the origin of many mixed-caste to the children of Ghritachi and Vishvakarma.

Ghritachi also fell in love with Gandharva Parjanya and gave birth to a daughter, Vedavati (or Devavati). In the Ramayana, Ghritachi also temporarily became the wife of King Kushanabha, son of Ajaka, and gave birth to a hundred daughters, whom the god Vayu wanted to marry. Later, to beget a son, Kushanabha performed the ritual Putrakameshti Yajna and she gave birth to a son, Gaadhi. Ghritachi also gave birth to the ten sons of King  Raudrashva, who belonged to Puru dynasty. The names of these sons wereRiteyu, Kaksheyu, Sthaṇḍileyu, Kriteyuka, Jaleyu, Sannateyu, Dharmeyu, Satyeyu, Vrateyu, and Vaneyu. According to the Mahabharata, Ghritachi once seduced sage Pramati, son of Chyavan, and mothered Ruru.

The Shanti Parva of the Mahabharata and Devi Bhagavata Purana narrate that the sage Vyasa is desiring an heir, but is reluctant to marry.  Ghritachi takes the form of a parrot and appears in front of him. Seeing her, the sage emits his seed on a fire-stick and a son, Shuka, is born from it. In the Adi Parva of the Mahabharata, it is narrated that Ghritachi, while bathing in the river Ganges, is seen by sage Bharadvaja. He becomes sexually aroused after seeing her and ejaculates into a basket. A son Drona—who later becomes the guru of the Pandavas and Kauravas— is born from it. The Shalya Parva reveals that a similar incident took place another time, this time leading to the birth of a daughter named Shrutavati.

References

Apsara
Characters in the Mahabharata
 characters in the Ramayana